Charles Vaughan may refer to:

Members of Parliament
Charles Vaughan (of Porthamal) (died 1630), Welsh landowner and politician who sat in the House of Commons in 1614 and 1625
Charles Vaughan (by 1529-74 or later), MP for Radnorshire
Charles Vaughan (MP for Shaftesbury), represented Shaftesbury (UK Parliament constituency) in 1572

Others
Charles John Vaughan (1816–1897), English churchman and scholar
Charles Richard Vaughan (1774–1849), British diplomat
Charles Vaughan (Emmerdale), character in Emmerdale UK TV series
Charles Vaughan, character in Survivors UK TV series

See also
Charles Vaughan-Lee (1867–1928), British naval officer
Charlie Vaughan (disambiguation)